Paul "Wine" Jones (July 1, 1946 – October 9, 2005) was an American contemporary blues guitarist and singer.

Music writer Paul Du Noyer noted that Jones, R. L. Burnside, Big Jack Johnson, Roosevelt "Booba" Barnes and James "Super Chikan" Johnson were "present-day exponents of an edgier, electrified version of the raw, uncut Delta blues sound".

Biography
Jones was born in Flora, Mississippi, and learned to play guitar by the age of four. In his teens he played at house parties, and later worked with James "Son" Thomas and harmonica player Little Willy Foster. However, Jones played music mainly as a pastime, He also worked with local musicians such as Bob and Sid Cobb, George Sheldon, Craig Collins, Tommy Hollis, Bill Abel, Tommy Warren, Zach Kiker, Goat Hill Productions, Pickle Byest and many others  while working on farms up to 1971, when he became a welder in Belzoni, Mississippi.

In 1995 and 1996, Jones performed outside of Mississippi, when he was a member of Fat Possum's "Mississippi Juke Joint Caravan". His 1995 debut album, Mule, was produced by the music critic Robert Palmer. On the album he was accompanied by drummer Sam Carr, and guitarist Big Jack Johnson. Fat Possum (an independent record label in Oxford, Mississippi), as well as managing the latter careers of Junior Kimbrough and R. L. Burnside, gave opportunity to a number of amateurs, mostly from rural Mississippi, who had seldom or never recorded before. Some, such as T-Model Ford and Asie Payton, moved on to higher billing, but others such as Jones, were left on the sidelines.

Jones died of cancer, at the age of 59, in Jackson, Mississippi, in October 2005.

Discography
Mule (1995) - Fat Possum
Pucker Up Buttercup (1999) - Fat Possum
Stop Arguing Over Me (2006) - Fat Possum

References

1946 births
2005 deaths
American blues guitarists
American male guitarists
American blues singers
Blues musicians from Mississippi
Deaths from cancer in Mississippi
Electric blues musicians
People from Flora, Mississippi
20th-century American singers
20th-century American guitarists
Guitarists from Mississippi
20th-century American male singers